Sociedad Deportiva Salvatierra is a football team based in Salvatierra/Agurain, Álava in the autonomous community of Basque Country. Founded in 1964, it plays in Regional Preferente. The club's stadium is Estadio Municipal de Salvatierra with a capacity of 1,000 seats.

It is a partner club of the local professional team Deportivo Alavés.

Season to season

2 seasons in Tercera División

References

External links
SD Salvatierra Official Website

Football clubs in the Basque Country (autonomous community)
Association football clubs established in 1964
Divisiones Regionales de Fútbol clubs
1964 establishments in Spain